Jackass Flat is  a suburb of the city of Bendigo in central Victoria, Australia.

History
At the 2006 census, Jackass Flat had a population of 224.

Ecology
Jackass Flat Nature Conservation Reserve, a  reserve was established in 1980.  It contains the rare Star-hair (Astrotricha linearis) and Shrub Violet (Hybanthus floribundus).

References

Suburbs of Bendigo
Bendigo